Magahat, also called Southern Binukidnon or Buglas Bukidnon, is a Central Philippine language of the mountains of Negros in the Philippines that has been strongly influenced by Cebuano and Hiligaynon. It is similar to Karolanos; Lobel (2013) suggests that it is a Bisayan language.

Demographics
Oracion (1974) reported a Magahat population of just under 400 people in Basay, Negros Oriental. Dantes (2015) reported a Magahat population of 2,478 individuals.

According to the Ethnologue, Magahat is spoken in the Mount Arniyo area near Bayawan, upper Tayaban, Tanjay, Santa Catalina, and Siaton municipalities in southern Negros Oriental Province, located just west of Dumaguete.

Sound changes
Lobel (2013: 39, 249, 273) reports that Southern Binukidnon is a Bisayan language that has some unique sound changes, such as Proto-Malayo-Polynesian *l > zero and the preservation of Proto-Malayo-Polynesian *-h in coda positions.

References

Central Philippine languages
Aeta languages
Languages of Negros Oriental